Megleno-Romanian may refer to:

Megleno-Romanians, an ethnic group native to the Balkans
Megleno-Romanian language, the language of this ethnicity, part of the Eastern Romance family

Language and nationality disambiguation pages